F Street Bridge may refer to:

F Street Bridge (Salida, Colorado), listed on the National Register of Historic Places (NRHP) in Chaffee County
F Street Bridge (Palouse, Washington), listed on the NRHP in Whitman County

See also
F Street (disambiguation)